Mark Foley (born 6 July 1967) is an Irish retired hurler who played as a centre-forward for the Cork senior hurling team.

Born in Timoleague, County Cork, Foley first played competitive hurling during his schooling at St. Finbarr's College. He arrived on the inter-county scene at the age of sixteen when he first linked up with the Cork minor team before later joining the under-21 and junior sides. He joined the senior panel during the 1987 championship. Foley immediately became a regular member of the starting fifteen and won one All-Ireland medal, two Munster medals and one National Hurling League medal. He was an All-Ireland runner-up on two occasions.

As a member of the Munster inter-provincial team on one occasion, Foley never won a Railway Cup medal. At club level he is a one-time championship medallist with Carbery, while he also played with Arigdeen Rangers.

Throughout his career Foley made 10 championship appearances. His retirement came following the conclusion of the 1993 championship.

In retirement from playing Foley became involved in team management and coaching. At club level he has worked closely with Bantry Blues.

Playing career

College

During his schooling at the St. Finbarr's College, Foley established himself as a key member of the senior hurling team. In 1984 he won a Harty Cup medal following a 4-9 to 2-7 defeat of Limerick CBS. The game was not without incident as Foley had his jaw broken during that game. In spite of this he still lined out in the All-Ireland decider against St. Kieran's College in the All-Ireland decider on 6 May 1984. Foley played with a faceguard and won an All-Ireland medal following a 1-15 to 0-8 victory.                         Following his secondary schooling in Farranferris, he attended UCC where he won 4 Fitzgibbon Cup medals , 1985, 1986,1987 and 1988. He captained the UCC freshers team to All Ireland glory in 1985. And was selected on the Combined Universities team in 85,86,87,88 and 89.

Club

After some success in the lower divisional grades with Argideen Rangers, Foley was a key member of the Carbery divisional team that reached a second successive championship decider in 1994. Midleton, one of the most successful teams of the previous decade, provided the opposition, however, a 3-12 to 3-6 victory gave Foley a Cork Senior Hurling Championship medal.

Two years later in 1996 Foley enjoyed major success with the Argideen Rangers club. After securing the divisional junior title Argideen subsequently faced Fr. O'Neill's in the county decider. A 3-9 to 0-11 victory, with Foley scoring 1-2, secured the championship.

Inter-county

Foley first played for Cork as a member of the minor team on 11 May 1983. He was introduced as a substitute in Cork's narrow 2-13 to 1-15 Munster semi-final defeat by Limerick.

After missing the  1984 championship due to a broken jaw, Foley was back the following year as a member of the starting fifteen. A 1-13 to 1-8 defeat of Tipperary secured a centenary year Munster medal. Wexford provided the opposition in the subsequent All-Ireland decider on 1 September 1985.  A 3-10 to 0-12 victory gave him an All-Ireland Minor Hurling Championship medal.

In 1987 Foley was a late addition to the Cork junior team that faced Wexford in the All-Ireland decider on 25 July 1987. A narrow 3-11 to 2-13 victory gave Cork the victory and secured an All-Ireland medal for Foley.

The following Foley was at full-forward on the Cork under-21 team. He won a Munster medal that year following a 4-12 to 1-7 defeat of Limerick. Cork subsequently faced Kilkenny in the All-Ireland decider on 11 September 1988. Played in St. Brendan's Park, Birr to commemorate the centenary of the very first senior All-Ireland final being played there, Cork triumphed by 4-12 to 1-5, with Foley winning an All-Ireland Under-21 Hurling Championship medal.

After being included and subsequently omitted from the Cork senior panel in 1987 and 1988, Foley made his senior championship debut on 4 June 1989 in an 0-18 apiece Munster semi-final draw with Waterford.

By 1990 Foley was a regular member of the starting fifteen. He won his first Munster medal on that year after a man of the match performance in the decider. Foley's 2-7 contributed to the 4-16 to 2-14 defeat of reigning champions Tipperary. The subsequent All-Ireland final on 2 September 1990 pitted Cork against Galway for the second time in four years. Galway were once again the red-hot favourites and justified this tag by going seven points ahead in the opening thirty-five minutes thanks to a masterful display by Joe Cooney. Cork fought back with an equally expert display by captain Tomás Mulcahy. The game was effectively decided on an incident which occurred midway through the second half when Cork goalkeeper Ger Cunningham blocked a point-blank shot from Martin Naughton with his nose. The umpires gave no 65-metre free, even though he clearly deflected it out wide. Cork went on to win a high-scoring and open game of hurling by 5–15 to 2–21. The victory gave Foley an All-Ireland medal.

Cork surrendered their titles in 1991, however, Foley claimed his second Munster medal in 1992 following a 1-22 to 3-11 of Limerick. On 6 September 1992 Cork faced Kilkenny in the All-Ireland decider. At half-time Cork were two points ahead, however, two second-half goals by John Power and Michael "Titch" Phelan supplemented a first-half D. J. Carey penalty which gave Kilkenny a 3-10 to 1-12 victory.

Foley won a National Hurling League medal in 1993 following a 3-11 to 1-12 defeat of Wexford. He was dropped from the starting fifteen for the subsequent championship campaign, a move which effectively brought an end to his inter-county career, as he had started a very busy dental practice in Bantry in West Cork which was demanding huge amounts of his time.

Inter-provincial

Foley was picked for the Munster inter-provincial team in 1988. He was at left corner-forward in the 4-13 to 2-11 semi-final defeat by Connacht.

Coaching career

In recent years Foley has been heavily involved as a mentor at various levels with Bantry Blues.

Honours

Player

St. Finbarr's College
Croke Cup (1): 1984
Harty Cup (1): 1984
UCC  Freshers All Ireland ( captain ) 1985, Fitzgibbon Cup 1985, 1986, 1987 and 1988.
Argideen Rangers
Cork Junior Hurling Championship (1): 1996

Carbery
Cork Senior Hurling Championship (1): 1994

Cork
All-Ireland Senior Hurling Championship (1): 1990
Munster Senior Hurling Championship (2): 1990, 1992
National Hurling League (1): 1992-93
All-Ireland Junior Hurling Championship (1): 1987
All-Ireland Under-21 Hurling Championship (1): 1985
Munster Under-21 Hurling Championship (1): 1985
All-Ireland Minor Hurling Championship (1): 1985
Munster Minor Hurling Championship (1): 1985

References

1967 births
Living people
Arigdeen Rangers hurlers
Carbery hurlers
Cork inter-county hurlers
Munster inter-provincial hurlers
All-Ireland Senior Hurling Championship winners